The Hermit Intercessors of the Lamb was a Roman Catholic Association of priests, brothers, nuns, and lay people, based in Nebraska, United States.  The 1998 canonical organization was suppressed by Omaha Archbishop George Joseph Lucas in 2010 and no longer exists.  The 1980 legal organization, Intercessors of the Lamb, Inc., continues to exist but is disassociated from the Roman Catholic Church.

History

Foundation
The Intercessors of the Lamb were founded in 1980. They trace their spiritual charism back to Saint John Eudes's Congregation of Jesus and Mary.

The foundress of the Intercessors, Nadine Mae Brown (Mother Nadine), after an adult conversion to Catholicism, felt  called to join the cloistered religious in the Sisters of the Cross.  This is the contemplative branch of the Congregation of the Good Shepherd. In 1976, Brown discerned that she was being called to bring  a deeper relationship with God to the faithful beyond the religious Orders.

She left the order and with permission from then Archbishop of Omaha, Daniel Eugene Sheehan, began to implement a different ministry, living and teaching contemplative spirituality and its intercessory lifestyle.  A local family later offered their carriage house, which served as a hermitage for Nadine, and their log cabin, which allowed for others to have communal intercessory prayer and also make individual retreats.

Nadine authored many books, tapes and materials in order to help in the instruction of contemplation.  She particularly emphasized the task of "spiritual warfare".  Among her publications are Bathe Seven Times: A Contemplative Look at the Seven Capitals Sins (2003) and God's Armor (1998).

The Intercessors of the Lamb were canonically erected on 27 May 1978 as a public Association of the Christian faithful under Archbishop Elden Francis Curtiss. Commensurate with a Roman Catholic lay ecclesial movement, this would have been one of the steps to the society's recognition as an Institute of Consecrated Life.

A separate legal entity, Intercessors of the Lamb, Inc., was incorporated in 1980 with the full permission of Archbishop Sheehan. The corporation manages the business affairs of the community and received its tax-exempt status in 1980. It continues today as a 501 (c)(3) organization with Fed. ID # 47-0625390.  The corporation retained ownership of the Bellwether property after the suppression, and owns property outside the United States.

Bellwether Center
In 1984, the growing community acquired  and two houses in the Ponca Hills area north of Omaha, Nebraska.  This became the Bellwether Contemplative Formation Center, referred to as "Bellwether".   Over the course of the next 25 years, Bellwether grew to be a  Contemplative Formation Center, which currently has two large retreat houses, a chapel, two residence homes, and a building which when completely renovated, will be able to accommodate groups desiring the spiritual formation and ministry of the Intercessors of the Lamb, Inc.  A "spirit of prayer, penance, silence and solitude" are promoted at Bellwether and serve as the four pillars of the contemplative way of life.

In 1994, Intercessors of the Lamb hosted its first annual international Workshop of Contemplative, Intercessory and Spiritual Warfare Prayer at Omaha.  This summer conference grew and thousands of people participated in the Intercessors' conferences.

Canonical visitation, suppression, and reorganization 
A request by Nadine Brown to the Roman Catholic Archdiocese of Omaha in 2010 to have the group made a full religious Institute led to a canonical visitation conducted by Reverend James Conn, a Jesuit and noted canon lawyer.

Several issues at the community were noted in his report.  On September 30, 2010 Archbishop George Joseph Lucas requested the resignation of Nadine Brown from both the corporation's board and the Association, and she complied. He appointed an Omaha priest, Fr. Gregory Baxter as temporary trustee of the Association.

Arbp. Lucas wished to bring the organization into conformity with Catholic canon law. Because most of the directors of the civil Board refused to allow the reforms, Lucas decreed the suppression of Hermit Association of the Intercessors of the Lamb on October 15 .  Lucas stated that the vows of the members ceased at the moment of suppression.   The Bellwether chapel is no longer recognised by the Archdiocese.

Forty-eight members of the community left Bellwether that day to accept temporary housing offered by the Archdiocese.  They lived on the former campus of Dana College in Blair, Nebraska, as "the Intercessor Relief Community."  Several other members decided to leave religious life and by 2012, the Relief community consisted of nine sisters.  The priests went back into various parishes and the brothers left the group.

A new community endorsed by the Archdiocese, "Brides of the Victorious Lamb", was formed in February 2012 and was located at St. Mary's Convent, Omaha.  The group developed a charism of ministering and providing spiritual support to the sick, elderly and dying and their families, but disbanded in 2019.

Nadine Brown had left Bellwether on 5 October 2010.  Two days after the suppression, she and ten hermits returned to the centre. They re-organised the community as "Intercessors of the Lamb, Inc.".  Their aim was to continue to promote contemplative spirituality, communal intercession and spiritual warfare prayer, providing retreats and 
spiritual guidance.

A July Prayer Weekend was held in 2011 at Bellwether, followed up with an Advent Prayer Weekend the same year.  A Spiritual Warfare Workshop took place in July 2012 and workshops have continued each year along with sales of religious material.

Nadine Brown died on 3 June 2013.

The 21st annual international conference was held at Bellwether in 2014 and this attracted people from five countries.

The mission statement of Intercessors of the Lamb, Inc. is:    
			
Intercessors of the Lamb, Inc. is a Christian organization dedicated to form contemplatives, nationally and internationally, through individualized and group retreats, spiritual direction, conferences, workshops, prayer seminars, and communal intercessory prayer ministry.  Intercessors of the Lamb, Inc. also offers literature, brochures, books, CDs, and DVDs instructive in the ways and methods of contemplation, directed toward the experience of interior union with God.

As of March 2015, there were 20 full-time individuals, from various backgrounds and nationalities and mostly female, who refer to themselves informally as the "Bellwether Lambs".  There are also many individuals from around the world who actively participate in the ministry, in their respective prayer circles. Currently Mary Elizabeth Weaver is the General Director of the corporation and President of the Board of Directors.

Charism
The society's particular ministry, or spiritual charism, is the promotion of contemplative spirituality and the provision of spiritual guidance, with the aim of inspiring spiritual renewal among Catholics. The priests, deacons, brothers, and nuns of the order called themselves hermits, and live with a "desert spirituality", a commitment that includes public vows of "chastity, poverty, obedience and zeal for the salvation of souls". The main apostolate of the association is prayer for priests.

The group maintained an international network of "Companion" groups that prayed in unity with the Intercessors, especially for priests, and new vocations to the priesthood.  The Companions were not canonically recognised, some have continued their work beyond the suppression.

The religious habit of the Intercessors is a teal scapular; the merging of the colors green, for the earth, and blue, for heaven expressed the society's role as intercessors .

Criticisms
During 2004, some neighbours to the Bellwether Contemplative Formation Center opposed their plans to build four group homes, the chapel (Our Lady of Light) and 18 hermitages.

There are allegations that many members signed over their assets to the Intercessors before 2010.

The Intercessors of the Lamb have a distinctly Catholic Charismatic Renewal piety. CatholicCulture.com noted the society's emphasis on Medjugorje and its "uncritical focus on an exclusively charismatic spirituality".

See also 
 House of Prayer, Achill

References

External links

Brides of the Victorious Lamb

Christian organizations established in 1998
Christianity in Omaha, Nebraska
Organizations established in 1980
Organizations based in Omaha, Nebraska
Christian organizations based in the United States
History of Catholicism in the United States
Religious organizations disestablished in 2010
Catholic lay organisations
Defunct Christian organizations